EOCT may refer to:

 End of Course Test
 Eastern Oklahoma County Turnpike